Tom Sosnoff (born March 6, 1957) is an entrepreneur, options trader, co-founder of Thinkorswim and tastytrade, and founder of Dough, Inc. He was senior vice president of trading and strategic initiatives at TD Ameritrade. Sosnoff promotes option trading as an important financial strategy for the individual investor. He has promoted this view by founding an online financial network, tastytrade, and by developing software products to support individual investor options trading.

Early life and education
Sosnoff, a native New Yorker, got his first job as a caddie at the age of 13. In 1979, Sosnoff received a BA degree in political science from University at Albany, SUNY and immediately began working for Drexel Burnham Lambert.

Career
Starting in the early 1980s, Sosnoff, through the Sosnoff Sheridan Group, was a lead market maker at the Chicago Board Options Exchange. By 1999, Sosnoff believed that option trading would largely move online and that individual investors would become interested in trading options if they had the software tools to do so. This led to his co-founding of Thinkorswim in 1999. In 2009, Thinkorswim was sold to TD Ameritrade for approximately $606 million and Sosnoff personally received $84 million. In 2011, Sosnoff announced that $20 million in venture capital had been raised to support his idea for a financial network called tastytrade. His aim in founding tastytrade was to create a financial news show focusing on options, which mixes content with comedy somewhat like the "Daily Show". In 2014, a Silicon Valley venture fund, Technology Crossover Ventures, invested $25 million into Dough Inc., also founded by Sosnoff, which includes tastytrade. In 2014, Sosnoff was co-winner of the EY Entrepreneur of the Year Midwest Award.

Options trading
Sosnoff advocates options trading as a viable long-term financial strategy for individual investors. He argues against financial experts who claim that options trading is too risky for individual investors. According to Sosnoff, the use of various options strategies in a portfolio can reduce the risk of owning stocks, and options trading is a portfolio management strategy that is well-suited for the individual investor. He devotes considerable time on his financial network, tastytrade, and in seminars demonstrating the mechanics and strategies of options trading.

References

External links
 Tom Sosnoff – tastytrade

1957 births
Living people
University at Albany, SUNY alumni
Options traders
20th-century American businesspeople
21st-century American businesspeople
American financial analysts
American broadcast news analysts
American financial company founders
American investors
American stock traders
American technology company founders
Stock and commodity market managers